Nyakasura School is a mixed, boarding, middle, and high school in Fort Portal, Kabarole District, Western Region of Uganda.

Location

History
The school was founded by Scotsman Ernest Ebohard Calwell, a retired naval officer, in 1926. Calwell was a teacher at King's College Budo when he fell out with the headmaster there. They had differences on what uniform the students should wear. There were two students from Toro Kingdom at Buddo at that time, by the names of Komwiswa and Byara. They convinced Calwell to come and ask the Omukama of Toro for land to set up a school like Buddo in Toro. Rukirabasaija Daudi Kasagama Kyebambe III showed the Calwell three sites, out of which he selected Nyakasura. He selected Scottish kilts as the boys' uniform.

Notable alumni
 Andrew Mwenda - journalist and community activist 
 Crispus Kiyonga - physician and politician. Minister of Defense in the Cabinet of Uganda
 Patrick Bitature - businessman, entrepreneur, and industrialist. chairman of the Private Sector Foundation Uganda, Umeme, and Electromaxx Uganda.
 Edward Rugumayo - author, politician, diplomat, academic, and environmentalist. Chancellor of Kampala University and Mountains of the Moon University.
 Jaberi Bidandi Ssali - politician and businessman. Former member of parliament for Nakawa Division. Minister for Local Government from 1989 until 2004. Founder of the People's Progressive Party.
 Aston Kajara - lawyer and politician. State Minister of Finance for Privatization.
 Olimi III of Toro - 12th Omukama of the Kingdom of Toro, Ugandan diplomat.

See also
 Education in Uganda
 Kabarole District

References

External links
 Location of Nyakasura School At Google Maps

Boarding schools in Uganda
Educational institutions established in 1926
Mixed schools in Uganda
Kabarole District
1926 establishments in Uganda